Family Christian Academy is a private Christian school in Independence, Missouri, in the Kansas City metropolitan area. The school serves grades Kindergarten through 12.

References

External links
 Family Christian Academy

Buildings and structures in Independence, Missouri
Christian schools in Missouri
Schools in Jackson County, Missouri
Private elementary schools in Missouri
Private middle schools in Missouri
Private high schools in Missouri